now Business News Channel is a 24-hour finance news channel.  It is now TV's first self-produced channel, which was launched at 9 am on 20 March 2006. The broadcast centre is located in Wanchai, Hong Kong.  There is also a broadcast centre in the Hong Kong Stock Exchange. In addition to live broadcast, there is a one-hour delay stock ticker. In addition to finance and business-related news, there are talk-show programmes. RTHK programmes are also shown on the weekend.

All programmes are recorded using Sony XDCAM and stored on Blu-ray discs.

It won a Peabody Award in 2009 for Sichuan Earthquake: One Year On because it "refused to forget, refused to ignore crucial questions".

See also
now TV (Hong Kong)

References

External links
http://www.now-tv.com/

Mass media in Hong Kong
Television stations in Hong Kong
Television channels and stations established in 2006
Peabody Award winners